The Woodlands Farm Trust is a registered charity that administers the 89-acre Woodlands Urban Farm in Royal Borough of Greenwich, London. The farm was saved by the community from development by house builders in a successful local campaign stretching from 1995 to 1997. It was previously threatened by the Greater London Council plan for the East London river crossing and road scheme which crossed the land and was planned to run through the adjacent ancient forest. The Farm Land is owned by The Co-operative Group a UK consumer co-operative society, but leased to the charity on a 999-year lease at peppercorn rent. The farm is located on  Shooter's Hill, situated a vein of protected Metropolitan Open stretching from Eltham to Plumstead and Welling in South East London, across Shooter's Hill (A207 road) from Oxleas Wood and located next to the new London Olympic Legacy Horse Riding College.

References

External links
Woodlands Farm Trust

Royal Borough of Greenwich
City farms in London